Bhadaure may refer to:

Bhadaure, Janakpur, Nepal
Bhadaure, Sagarmatha, Nepal